Warsaw School may refer to:

Universities
 Warsaw School of Economics
 Warsaw School of Social Sciences and Humanities

Schools of thought
 Warsaw School (mathematics)
 Warsaw School (history of ideas)

See also
 Lwów-Warsaw School (disambiguation)